Denis Jean Hamel (born May 10, 1977) is a Canadian former professional ice hockey left winger who last played semi-professionally in the LNAH. A former star in junior, Hamel was not able to translate his scoring success in junior to the National Hockey League (NHL), although he had success at the AHL level, being named an AHL All-Star 3 times. After a serious knee injury in 2000, Hamel's skating speed was diminished and his ability to contribute in the NHL was limited. He was known as a fan favorite with the Binghamton Senators, and is known for his contributions to the community, for which he won the 2008 AHL Man of the Year award.

Playing career
Hamel was drafted 153rd overall by the St. Louis Blues in the 1995 NHL Entry Draft. Before he graduated from junior hockey, the Blues traded his rights to the Buffalo Sabres. After 3 seasons with the Sabres' AHL team, the Rochester Americans, he played two full seasons with the Sabres in 2000–01 and 2001–02. During the 2000–01 season, he suffered a serious knee injury which limited his play to 41 games and affected his skating speed.  He split the 2003–04 season between Buffalo and Rochester. For the 2003–04 season, Hamel signed with the Ottawa Senators organization and played a majority of his games with the Binghamton Senators, Ottawa's AHL affiliate. In the 2005–2006 season, Hamel set the Binghamton team record for most goals in a season with 56.  In addition, he was the captain of Binghamton Senators for the 2005–2006 season.

In 2006–07 he returned to the NHL as a regular forward with the Ottawa Senators, and played 43 games with the club. After the Senators suffered injuries to Mike Fisher and Jason Spezza, the club traded for Mike Comrie who would take Hamel's place after the injured players returned. On February 10, 2007, the Atlanta Thrashers claimed Hamel off waivers after Ottawa wanted to assign Hamel to Binghamton. After playing three games for Atlanta, he was placed on waivers and claimed by the Philadelphia Flyers on February 27, 2007, where he finished the season.

On July 6, 2007, Hamel returned to the Senators organization, signing a three-year American Hockey League contract with the Binghamton Senators. He chose to sign with Binghamton, as he intended to have stability in his career. He played the entire 2007–08 season with Binghamton, scoring 32 goals in 67 games. He played there through the 2008-09 and 2009-10 season before being released as a UFA in the 2010 offseason. He was signed by the Adirondack Phantoms on October 30, 2010, one month into the AHL season.

Personal
Hamel married Julie Brisson, a figure skater, on July 18, 2015 in Casselman, Ontario.

Records
Holds the following Binghamton Senators franchise records:
Most goals in a single season (56 in 2005–06)
Most career goals and points in franchise history (124 and 236)

Career statistics

Awards and honours

References

External links
 

1977 births
Adirondack Phantoms players
Atlanta Thrashers players
Binghamton Senators players
Buffalo Sabres players
Canadian ice hockey left wingers
Chicoutimi Saguenéens (QMJHL) players
Ice hockey people from Quebec
Living people
Ottawa Senators players
People from Lachute
Philadelphia Flyers players
Rochester Americans players
St. Louis Blues draft picks